Cycle is an album by Paul Horn which was originally released on the RCA Victor label in 1965.

Within three years, Horn would abandon jazz altogether to work on atmospheric mood music".

Reception

AllMusic awarded the album 2 stars stating: "One can hear hints of Paul Horn's future directions on this obscure LP. ...so this is not an album for everyone."  Cycle, credited to the Paul Horn Quintet, was nonetheless nominated for a 1965 Grammy Award for Best Jazz Album, Small Ensemble.

Track listing

Personnel
Paul Horn - alto saxophone, flute, clarinet
Lynn Blessing - vibraphone
Mike Lang - piano
Bill Plummer - bass
Bill Goodwin - drums
James Thompson, John Turnbull - bagpipes (tracks 1 & 6)

References

Paul Horn (musician) albums
1965 albums
Albums produced by Al Schmitt
RCA Victor albums